Handrick is a surname of German origin. Notable people with the surname include:

Gotthard Handrick (1908–1978), German Olympic athlete and Spanish Civil War and World War II fighter pilot
Joe Handrick (born 1965), American politician
Jörg Handrick (born 1968), German ice hockey player

See also 

 Hendrick (surname)
 Hendrik (given name)
 Hendricks (surname)

References

Surnames
Surnames of German origin

German-language surnames